Paolo Giovio il Giovane or Paolo Giovio the Younger (died 1585) was a Roman Catholic prelate who served as Bishop of Nocera de' Pagani (1560–1585).

Biography
On 29 Nov 1560, Paolo Giovio was appointed during the papacy of Pope Pius IV as Coadjutor Bishop of Nocera de' Pagani.
He succeeded to the bishopric in December 1560.
He served as Bishop of Nocera de' Pagani until his death in Dec 1560.

References

External links and additional sources
 (for Chronology of Bishops) 
 (for Chronology of Bishops) 

16th-century Italian Roman Catholic bishops
Bishops appointed by Pope Pius IV
1585 deaths